Club MTV is a half hour television show modeled after American Bandstand  that aired on MTV from August 31, 1987, to June 26, 1992. Club MTV was part of MTV's second generation of programming, as the channel was phasing out its original 5 VJs and introducing new ones.

Format
Hosted by Downtown Julie Brown (Kevin Seal hosted the pilot) at The Palladium, a large dance club in New York City, the show cut back and forth between teenagers and young adults dancing to a hit music video. Musical guests often introduced their new brand singles.

Legacy
On March 20, 2005, VH1 Classic aired a marathon of old Club MTV episodes.

On April 25, 2020, MTV bought Club MTV back for a special, titled Club MTV: Dance Together hosted by D-Nice and Keke Palmer. The one night only event served as a fund raising benefit to help music programs during the coronavirus pandemic.

See also
VH1 Dance Machine
The Grind
Electric Circus
The Party Machine with Nia Peeples
Dance Party USA
Amp
Camille Donatacci (a regular dancer on the show)
Party to Go

References

External links

1980s American music television series
1990s American music television series
1987 American television series debuts
1992 American television series endings
MTV original programming
MTV weekday shows
Dance television shows
English-language television shows